{{DISPLAYTITLE:C23H29NO3}}
The molecular formula C23H29NO3 (molar mass: 367.48 g/mol, exact mass: 367.2147 u) may refer to:

 Benzethidine
 Codorphone
 Fenbutrazate
 Phenoperidine
 Propiverine